Rise is a 1979 album by Herb Alpert.

History

In 1979, the song "Rise", written by Andy Armer and Alpert's nephew Randy "Badazz" Alpert but without an accompanying album, became a worldwide sensation. The 12" version was a favorite of club DJs and the 7" single, released on July 20, 1979, reached the top of the Billboard Hot 100 chart in October, staying there for two weeks. "Rise" was Alpert's first No. 1 hit in the US since "This Guy's in Love with You" spent four weeks there in 1968. Armer and the Alperts then set about creating an album to capitalize on the song's success, and Rise was released in September.

Side 1 of Rise consists of original songs composed by Armer, Herb Alpert and Randy Alpert. Side 2 contains cover versions of songs that Herb Alpert admired. All songs featured the elder Alpert on trumpet, with many other studio musicians contributing.

The opening track, "1980", is an instrumental theme written by Herb Alpert that NBC Sports executive Don Ohlmeyer had originally commissioned for the network's planned coverage of the Summer Olympics in Moscow, but it was used seven years later as the official theme song for NBC's telecast of the 1986 FIFA World Cup in Mexico. The closing song on the first side is another Armer and Randy Alpert song called "Rotation", which was released as the follow-up single to "Rise", peaking at No. 30 on the Hot 100 chart in January 1980.

Side 2 of the album includes a cover of "Street Life," originally recorded by the Crusaders, a version of the Bill Withers song "Love Is" featuring Herb Alpert's vocals and a dance rendition of Joaquín Rodrigo's Concierto de Aranjuez classical composition.

Rise was one of the first pop albums to use digital recording technology. It was recorded on a 3M 32-track recorder at Alpert's A&M Records studios in Hollywood, California. 

The album peaked at No. 1 on the Billboard Jazz Albums chart and at No. 6 on both the Billboard 200 and R&B album chart, selling more than three million copies.

Track listing

Original version

Side one
"1980" (2:25) (Herb Alpert)
"Rise" (7:37) (Andy Armer, Randy "Badazz" Alpert)
"Behind the Rain" (5:34) (Herb Alpert)
"Rotation" (5:12) (Andy Armer, Randy "Badazz" Alpert)

Side two
"Street Life" (5:01) (Joe Sample, Will Jennings)
"Love Is" (4:28) (Bill Withers, Paul Smith)
"Angelina" (4:13) (Pete Sinfield, Gary Brooker)
"Aranjuez (Mon Amour)" (6:42) (Joaquín Rodrigo)

2007 reissue
"1980" (2:25)
"Rise" (7:37)
"Behind the Rain" (5:34)
Rotation (5:12)
Aranjuez (Mon Amour) (6:42)
"Love Is" (4:28)
"Angelina" (4:13)
"Street Life" (5:01)
"Rotation" (Alternate Version) (4:28)
"Aranjuez (Mon Amour)" (2007 Dance Remix) (5:08)

Production
Produced By Herb Alpert & Randy "Badazz" Alpert
Engineers: Don Hahn, Mark Smith
Assistant Engineers: Don Koldon, Skip Cottrell, Steve Katz
Remixed By Don Hahn; Assisted By Don Koldon

References

 Liner notes, 2007 Shout! Factory CD.

1979 albums
Herb Alpert albums
Albums produced by Herb Alpert
A&M Records albums